Karl Slover (September 21, 1918 – November 15, 2011) was a Slovakian-born American actor best known as one of the Munchkins in The Wizard of Oz (1939). Only three other adult Munchkin performers remained alive at the time of Slover's death.

Early years
Slover was born as Karl Kosiczky on September 21, 1918, in Prakovce, Slovakia (then Prakfalva, Kingdom of Hungary). Diagnosed at an early age with pituitary dwarfism, Slover was barely two feet tall by his eighth birthday. Dwarfism was not a family trait; his father stood six feet six inches, and his mother was just a few inches shorter. Slover's father went to great lengths to make Slover taller, including and taking him to Hungary, where doctors fixed stretchers to his arms and legs.

Career
When Slover was just nine years old, his father sent him to work for a traveling show based out of Berlin, Germany. After working with the show for several years, Slover moved to the United States where he joined another traveling show. It wasn't long before Slover began appearing in films like The Terror of Tiny Town, Block-Heads, Bringing Up Baby, and They Gave Him a Gun.

Slover was working in Hawaii when his circus manager sent him to Hollywood, where little people were needed for an upcoming film called The Wizard of Oz. At the age of 21 and standing just 4 feet 4 inches, Slover played the parts of four Munchkins in the movie; the first trumpeter, a soldier, one of the sleepy heads, and was among those who sang "Follow the Yellow Brick Road".

His "Oz" co-stars, The Matina Triplets whose names were Bela "Ike", Lajos "Leo", and Matjus "Mike" were originally from Budapest. They also appeared in the film as Munchkins.

After filming Oz, Slover began working for the 'Original World Famous Singers Midget Show' where he sang and danced throughout the United States. When the show ended in 1942, Slover joined the Royal American Carnival in Tampa, Florida. At this time he took the last name Slover, the last name of his stage manager.

Later years
Slover remained very active in his later years and participated in several celebrations related to The Wizard of Oz. Every June, Slover attended festivities celebrating Judy Garland's birthday at the Judy Garland Museum & Birthplace in Grand Rapids, Minnesota. In November 2007, Slover joined seven other surviving munchkins in Hollywood where honorary mayor Johnny Grant unveiled a star dedicated to the munchkins on the Hollywood Walk of Fame.

Death 
Slover died on November 15, 2011, at age 93. He resided at an assisted living facility in Dublin, Georgia, at the time of his death. His interment was in Rentz's cemetery. At the time of Slover's death, three other munchkin actors were still alive from Oz: Jerry Maren, Margaret Williams Pellegrini and Ruth Robinson Duccini. He outlived every major cast member.

Filmography

References

External links

1918 births
2011 deaths
Male actors from Georgia (U.S. state)
American male film actors
Czechoslovak emigrants to the United States
Male actors from Berlin
People from Gelnica District
People from Dublin, Georgia
Actors with dwarfism